The 2008 Canadian Tour season ran from April to September and consisted of 15 tournaments. It was the 39th season of the Canadian Professional Golf Tour.

The season started with two events in the United States (in April), followed by three events in Mexico (in April and May), and finishing with 10 events in Canada (in June through September). American John Ellis won the Order of Merit.

Schedule
The following table lists official events during the 2008 season.

References

External links
Official site

Canadian Tour
PGA Tour Canada